Philipsburg is a town in and the county seat of Granite County, Montana, United States. The population was 841 at the 2020 census. The town was named after the famous mining engineer Philip Deidesheimer, who designed and supervised the construction of the ore smelter around which the town originally formed. He platted the townsite in 1867.

Geography

Philipsburg is located at  (46.333108, -113.296564). Montana Highway 1 passes through town. Granite Ghost Town State Park is nearby.

Demographics

2010 census
As of the census of 2010, there were 820 people, 413 households, and 217 families residing in the town. The racial makeup of the town was 96.8% White, 0.1% African American, 0.9% Native American, 0.2% Asian, 0.4% from other races, and 1.6% from two or more races. Hispanic or Latino of any race were 1.8% of the population.

There were 413 households, of which 16.0% had children under the age of 18 living with them, 40.0% were married couples living together, 8.5% had a female householder with no husband present, 4.1% had a male householder with no wife present, and 47.5% were non-families. 40.0% of all households were made up of individuals, and 17.9% had someone living alone who was 65 years of age or older. The average household size was 1.92 and the average family size was 2.53.

The median age in the town was 54.4 years. 14.8% of residents were under the age of 18; 4.4% were between the ages of 18 and 24; 17.2% were from 25 to 44; 34.2% were from 45 to 64; and 29.4% were 65 years of age or older. The gender makeup of the town was 49.1% male and 50.9% female.

Economy

Since the closure of local mines and sawmills in the 1980s the town's future was uncertain.  The surrounding county is home to more than 24 ghost towns of former mining and timber towns.  However the 1990s saw a wave of newcomers purchasing and restoring the numerous buildings in the town's historic district.  These included several retailers who expanded on the popularity of sapphire hunting in gravel from the nearby Sapphire Mountain range.  The Sweet Palace candy store opened in 1998 and became a regional tourist destination. In 2003 the historic Broadway Hotel was reopened by filmmaker Jim Jenner and numerous other lodging operations followed.  Jenner's award-winning 2017 film, "Saving the Burg" captured the story of the town's rebirth and aired on PBS more than a dozen times.

Major industries in Philipsburg are Accommodation and Food Service, Educational Services, Healthcare and Social Assistance. The main job fields are Service, Management, Business, Science and Arts, Sales and Office.

The Ranch at Rock Creek is Granite County's largest private employer. It is a luxury ranch, opened in 2007 and located 15 minutes from town, for celebrities and the well-to-do.

Other major employers are Discovery Basin Ski Area, Granite County Medical Center and Rest Home and the Philipsburg School District.

Philipsburg Brewing Company opened 2012 in the historical Sayrs Building, and expanded in 2015 to the historic Silver Springs Brewery on the eastern edge of town.   The brewery sells bottled and keg beer throughout Montana and recently expanded to sell drinking water in recyclable aluminum bottles.  The environmentally friendly packaging has led to contracts to provide bottled water to both Yellowstone and Glacier National Park concessionaires.

Project Vote Smart was located approximately 25 miles from Philipsburg for 16 years.  It annually attracted interns to work on its elected official database and many of the organization's employees lived in Philipsburg. After the 2016 presidential election, Vote Smart relocated to Des Moines, Iowa.

Climate
Philipsburg's climate transitions between semi-arid (Köppen BSk) and humid continental (Köppen Dfb). Winters are long and dry, but relatively mild, while summers are warm and distinctly wetter.

Infrastructure
Riddick Field is a public use airport located 1 mile southeast of town.

Education
Philipsburg Public Schools educates students from kindergarten through 12th grade. Granite High School's team name is the Prospectors.

Philipsburg Public Library serves the area.

Cultural references
Philipsburg is notable for being the setting and subject of the poem "Degrees of Gray in Philipsburg" by celebrated Northwest poet Richard Hugo.

Actress Kate Bosworth married American director Michael Polish in Philipsburg on August 31, 2013. Actress Scarlett Johansson married boyfriend French journalist Romain Dauriac in Philipsburg on October 1, 2014. Kate Bosworth and Scarlett Johansson appeared together in the 1998 film The Horse Whisperer, much of which was shot in Montana.

Philipsburg won the 2015 Sunset Magazine Award for "Best Municipal Makeover," beating out entrants that included Reno, Nevada and Sacramento, California.

References

External links

 Live in Philipsburg
 Philipsburg, Montana (Chamber of Commerce site)

Towns in Granite County, Montana
County seats in Montana